Humaira Zaheer is a Pakistani actress. She is known for her roles in dramas Bharosa Pyar Tera, Hiddat, Log Kya Kahenge, Shehr-e-Malal and Sehra Main Safar.

Early life
Humaira was born on 8 September 1960 in Lahore, Pakistan. She completed her studies from University of Lahore.

Career
She made her debut as an actress in 1980s on PTV and she was known for portraying sad lead roles. She was part of many television series on PTV Channel and was acknowledged by the audience. She was noted for her roles in dramas Chemistry, Parsa, Sanjha, Mohabbat Rooth Jaye Toh and Mata-e-Jaan Hai Tu. She also appeared in drama Sehra Main Safar along with Zarnish Khan, Emmad Irfani, Aiman Khan and Anoushey Ashraf and Ab Kar Meri Rafugari with Ushna Shah and Daniyal Raheal. Since then she appeared in dramas Hiddat, Bharosa Pyar Tera, Shehr-e-Malal, Mausam and Log Kya Kahenge.

Filmography

Television

Telefilm

References

External links
 

1960 births
Living people
20th-century Pakistani actresses
Pakistani television actresses
21st-century Pakistani actresses